The Rotchev House is a historic house at Fort Ross State Historic Park in the U.S. state of California. Built in 1812, it is the fort's only building to survive from the period of the Russian-American Company's California settlement. It is one of a very small number of Russian-built structures in the United States, and was designated a National Historic Landmark in 1970 as the Commander's House, Fort Ross. (Fort Ross as a whole is also a National Historic Landmark.)

Description and history
The Rotchev House is located in Fort Ross State Historic Park, located on the Northern California coastline of Sonoma County. The planking is chiseled in place to help channel water away from the gaps between planks further down the roof. The interior is divided into seven chambers and a larger hall.

Fort Ross was founded in 1812 by a team from the Russian-American Company under the leadership of Ivan Kuskov. The Rotchev House is one of the buildings constructed during the first year; other buildings included barracks, a chapel, and storehouses. The fort was sold in 1841 to John Sutter and was vacated by the Russian company in 1842. The house is named for the last Russian commander, Alexander Rotchev.

See also
List of National Historic Landmarks in California
National Register of Historic Places listings in Sonoma County, California

References

National Historic Landmarks in California
National Register of Historic Places in Sonoma County, California
Houses on the National Register of Historic Places in California
Houses completed in 1812
Houses in Sonoma County, California
Russian-American Company